A list of films produced in Egypt in 1966. For an A-Z list of films currently on Wikipedia, see :Category:Egyptian films.

1966

External links
 Egyptian films of 1966 at the Internet Movie Database
 Egyptian films of 1966 at elCinema.com

Lists of Egyptian films by year
1966 in Egypt
Lists of 1966 films by country or language